Braya pilosa is a long-lived perennial flowering plant of the mustard family known by the common name hairy braya. It has one to many stems 4–12 cm long, erect to ascending to almost prostrate and moderately to densely hairy, and can be distinguished from other Braya species by its large flowers and globose fruits with very long styles. The plant arises from a tuft of basal leaves, with white flowers arranged in dense clusters. Its range is limited to the unglaciated portions of Cape Bathurst and Baillie Islands on the shore of the Beaufort Sea in the Northwest Territories, and it is listed at G2 - imperiled by NatureServe and endangered by the Committee on the Status of Endangered Wildlife in Canada (COSEWIC). Its chief threats are loss of habitat through rapid coastal erosion and saline wash from storm surges, and by melting permafrost.

References

Further reading

pilosa
Plants described in 1830

Endemic flora of Canada